This is a list of some artists whose new or back catalog recordings have been released on high-resolution Super Audio CD (SACD). SACD is a high fidelity format that allows four times greater audio bit rate than Compact Disc for stereo recordings, and allows surround sound recordings. According to SA-CD.net, there are over 6200 titles released on SACD, with a little more than half being classical music.

Popular artists

Aerosmith
After Forever
Al Kooper
Alice In Chains
Aretha Franklin
Asia
Ayumi Hamasaki
Barbra Streisand
Beck
Björk
Black Sabbath
Blood, Sweat & Tears
Blue Öyster Cult
Bob Dylan
Bon Jovi
Boston
Boz Scaggs
Bread
Bruce Springsteen
Can
Carpenters
Carly Simon
Cat Stevens
Celine Dion
Cream
Creedence Clearwater Revival
Cyndi Lauper
David Bowie
Dead Can Dance
Deep Purple
Depeche Mode
Diana Krall
Dire Straits
Donald Fagen
Don McLean
Dredg
Eagles
Earth, Wind & Fire
Eleanor McEvoy
Eddie Jobson
Elisa
Elton John
Elvis Presley
Eric Clapton
Feeder
Fleetwood Mac
Foreigner
Franco Battiato
Frankie Goes to Hollywood
Gene Clark
Genesis
George Harrison
Gloria Estefan
Godsmack
Goldfrapp
Grateful Dead
Hall & Oates
Hins Cheung (張敬軒)
Hiromi
Iron Butterfly
Isaac Hayes
James Taylor
Jefferson Airplane
Jeff Wayne
Joe Satriani
Joe Walsh
John Denver
John Hammond
John Lee Hooker
Journey
Keane
Kenny Loggins
Kiss
Linda Ronstadt
Lionel Richie
Los Lobos
Ludacris
Lynyrd Skynyrd
Manowar
Mark Knopfler
Meat Loaf
Michael Bloomfield
Michael Jackson
Mike Oldfield
Moloko
Nickel Creek
Nine Inch Nails
Norah Jones
Oasis
Olivia Newton-John
Otis Redding
Peter Gabriel
Pink Floyd
Pixies
Rainbow
Rickie Lee Jones
Roger Waters
Roxy Music
Ry Cooder
Sam Cooke
Santana
Scorpions
Shania Twain
Stephen Stills
Steve Winwood
Steppenwolf
Sting
Super Furry Animals
Talk Talk
Talking Heads
Tangerine Dream
The Allman Brothers Band
The Art of Noise
The Band
The Beach Boys
The Cars
The Doors
The Flying Burrito Brothers
The Human League
The Jimi Hendrix Experience
The Kinks
The Moody Blues
The Offspring
The Paul Butterfield Blues Band
The Police
The Rolling Stones (ABKCO catalog)
The Who
Stevie Ray Vaughan
Tom Waits
Vanilla Fudge
Vince Gill
Weezer
Zucchero "Sugar" Fornaciari

Jazz artists

Monty Alexander
Chet Baker
Count Basie
Art Blakey
Michael Brecker
Flim and the BB's
Dave Brubeck Quartet
Jen Chapin
Nat King Cole
John Coltrane
Larry Coryell
Jamie Cullum
Miles Davis
Al Di Meola
Duke Ellington
Bill Evans
Carlos Franzetti
Grant Green
Herbie Hancock
Coleman Hawkins
Billie Holiday
Freddie Hubbard
Lee Konitz
Pat Martino
Pat Metheny
Charles Mingus
Thelonious Monk
The Manhattan Transfer
Wes Montgomery
Art Pepper
Oscar Peterson
Sonny Rollins
Jimmy Smith
Spyro Gyra
McCoy Tyner
Hiromi Uehara
Weather Report
Mike Wofford

Classical artists

Piano

Murray Perahia
Vladimir Ashkenazy
Horacio Gutierrez
Andre Watts
Lang Lang
Mitsuko Uchida
Yevgeny Sudbin
Alfred Brendel
Arcadi Volodos
Martha Argerich
Mikhail Pletnev
Jean-Yves Thibaudet
Igor Tchetuev
Helene Grimaud
Nikolai Lugansky
Christian Zacharias
Angela Hewitt

Violin

Julia Fischer
Anne-Sophie Mutter
Joshua Bell
Hilary Hahn
Lara St. John
Victoria Mullova
Midori
Christian Tetzlaff
Frank Peter Zimmermann
Vladimir Spivakov
Janine Jansen
Rachel Podger

Cello

Yo-Yo Ma
Pieter Wispelwey
Matt Haimovitz
Mischa Maisky
Gavriel Lipkind
Anne Gastinel
Michal Kanka

Harp
Lavinia Meijer

Conductors

Carlos Kleiber
Chick Corea
Valery Gergiev
Vladimir Ashkenazy
Richard Hickox
Jerry Goldsmith
Vladimir Jurowski
Herbert von Karajan
Jesús López-Cobos
Michael Tilson Thomas
Seiji Ozawa
Riccardo Chailly
Claudio Abbado
Zubin Mehta
Yuri Simonov
Mstislav Rostropovich
Leonard Slatkin
Václav Neumann
David Zinman
Yakov Kreizberg
Roger Norrington
Bernard Haitink
Charles Mackerras
Ivan Fischer
Esa-Pekka Salonen
Neeme Järvi
Paavo Järvi
André Previn
Kurt Masur
Pierre Boulez
Robert Spano
James Levine
Lawrence Foster
Donald Runnicles
Erich Kunzel
Semyon Bychkov

Baroque and pre-Baroque

René Jacobs
Marc Minkowski
Nikolaus Harnoncourt
Harry Christophers
Jordi Savall
Diego Fasolis
John Eliot Gardiner
Masaaki Suzuki
Hidemi Suzuki
Nicholas McGegan
Robert King
Andrew Manze
Sigiswald Kuijken

Singers

Lorraine Hunt Lieberson
Thomas Quasthoff
Angelika Kirchschlager
Anne Sofie von Otter
Andreas Scholl
Bryn Terfel
Anna Netrebko
Nancy Argenta
Christine Brewer
Gerald Finley
Richard Croft
Paul Agnew
Peter Harvey
Simone Kermes
Elly Ameling
Johan Botha
Bernarda Fink
Dorothea Röschmann
Cecilia Bartoli
Andrea Bocelli
Sarah Brightman

References

SACD
SACD